Sidney Jellicoe (25 August 1906 – 24 November 1973) was a British-Canadian dean emeritus, biblical scholar, Harrold professor of Divinity, theological educator, and priest.

Biography 
He was a scholar of St Chad's College, Durham. After being ordained by Archbishop William Temple in York Minster in 1934, he served as a parish priest in England for eleven years, then for eight years was Chaplain and Lecturer at Bishop Otter Training College, Chichester. In 1952, he became Dean of Divinity and Harrold Professor at Bishop's University, Lennoxville, Quebec. In 1966, he became Dean of Theology and in 1971 Dean Emeritus, as well as first Chairman of the Division of Graduate Studies.

Awards 
In 1955, Diocesan College, Montreal, conferred on him the degree of Doctor of Divinity (honoris causa) and in 1970 Bishop's University granted him the honorary degree of Doctor of Civil Law.

Academic work 
He was one of the founders of the International Organization for Septuagint and Cognate Studies (IOSCS) including Robert A. Kraft.

Published works 
He also wrote a number of articles for learned journals, such as New Testament Studies and the Catholic Biblical Quarterly. In 1968, his definitive work on 20th century Septuagint studies was published by Oxford Clarendon Press, entitled The Septuagint and Modern Study.

References

External links 
Sidney Jellicoe's photograph

1906 births
1973 deaths
Old Testament scholars
Alumni of St Chad's College, Durham
Academic staff of Bishop's University
British university and college faculty deans
Canadian university and college faculty deans
British emigrants to Canada
20th-century British male writers
20th-century Canadian male writers